The Stick Soldiers series consists of a pair of keyboard-based, side-scrolling deathmatch shooters for the PC in which players control a pencil-drawn stick soldier with various weapons-ranging from the Uzi to the Grenade Launcher, Sniper Rifle, and Flamethrower—to destroy other stick soldiers in their attempt to reach the specified frag limit. In Stick Soldiers 2 (abbreviated as "SS2"), rankings are point numbers, while the original Stick Soldiers ("SS," or "SS1") gives rankings as titles, with the first being "Cadet" and the last, "Fragmeister." Both games are generally very simple. It is possible to create different sprites for all games, and the second allows modification of weapon attributes, new weapons, and new sounds. A third game was in slow development for many years beginning shortly after the release of SS2, which has since been abandoned.

The webmaster for the first two games' websites was "SuperRoy" (Andrew Vehlies). SS1 and SS2 were created by AdmiralBinary, now known as "fonger" (Tim Cowley) — who handled the games' C++ coding — and anti_ (Dylan Allison), the main artist and mapper of the games. Cowley left the team soon after releasing SS2, having Andrew Russell replace him, and BlackjacK (real name unknown) replaced SuperRoy as webmaster. Allison remained, creating images and level graphics, and Russell hired six new programmers to the team, which has since disbanded.

Stick Soldiers 1
The first Stick Soldiers game proved to be a major hit at Gamedev.net, where its production was enthusiastically observed. It used modifiable bitmap images and supported deathmatch with a primitive one-way CTF mode, later receiving (as a separate download) a red-vs.-blue Team version as another executable file. According to Cowley, it took only a few weeks to develop.

Stick Soldiers 2

The next game in the series, Stick Soldiers 2 is a considerable expansion upon SS1, in that soldiers' movement is smoothly animated instead of using static bitmap images. It also adds more weaponry and versatility in modification (it allows weapons' attributes and sounds to be changed instead of graphics alone), bears a much more versatile map editor, and many more features, such as bounce pads, although some game features found in the first Stick Soldiers game (such as ricocheting bullets, the helmet powerup, and the popular Flak Cannon weapon) were not included in SS2. Many fan-made weapons, maps, mods, guides, and other miscellaneous files were once stored and accessible at the Stick Soldiers Files, a defunct file-sharing website.

The development of SS2 took about 6 months, and was halted by a hard drive crash that destroyed the only existing copy of the game's source code. Though no longer called "alpha," the last release was, according to Cowley, not nearly complete, but Cowley has nonetheless moved onto other projects since.

Stick Soldiers 3

Stick Soldiers 3 was the next installment, rumored to cost roughly US$20 for the full version. Its release date was unknown for years; Russell hired six programmers since development had been progressing extremely slowly, but the staff since continuously declared that work is progressing rapidly. Some speculated that the game would be released by roughly mid-2007, though after a comment by Andrew Russell himself, most Stick Soldiers forum members believed the true release date was around 2008.

On 26 August 2007, the development of Stick Soldiers 3 was canceled, as announced by staff leader Andrew Russell.

External links
Andrew Russell Studios
Acid-Play's Stick Soldiers Download Page
Acid-Play's Stick Soldiers 2 Download Page

References
Gamedev.net's Stick Soldiers Thread

Windows games
Run and gun games